The Empress of Morocco is a 1673 tragedy by the English writer Elkanah Settle. It was originally staged by the Duke's Company at the Dorset Garden Theatre in London. The cast included Henry Harris as Muly Labas, William Smith as  Muly Hamet, Thomas Betterton as Grimalhaz, Matthew Medbourne as Hametalhaz, John Crosby as  Abdelcador, Mary Betterton as Laula and Mary Lee as Mariamne. The published version was dedicated to Henry Howard, Earl of Norwich.

References

Bibliography
 Van Lennep, W. The London Stage, 1660-1800: Volume One, 1660-1700. Southern Illinois University Press, 1960.

1673 plays
West End plays
Tragedy plays
Plays by Elkanah Settle